Annie Baker (born April 1981) is an American playwright and teacher who won the 2014 Pulitzer Prize for her play The Flick. Among her works are the Shirley, Vermont plays, which take place in the fictional town of Shirley: Circle Mirror Transformation, Nocturama, Body Awareness, and The Aliens. She was named a MacArthur Fellow in 2017.

Early life
Baker's family lived in Cambridge, Massachusetts, when Baker was born, but soon moved to Amherst, Massachusetts, where she grew up and where her father, Conn Nugent, was an administrator for the Five Colleges consortium and her mother Linda Baker was a psychology doctoral student. Her brother is author Benjamin Baker Nugent. Baker graduated from the Department of Dramatic Writing at New York University's Tisch School of the Arts. She earned her Master of Fine Arts degree in playwriting from Brooklyn College in 2009. One of her early jobs was as a guest-wrangler helping to oversee contestants on the reality-television program The Bachelor.

She is married to Nico Baumbach, with whom she has one child. Her brother-in-law is Noah Baumbach.

Career

Plays
Body Awareness, her first play produced Off-Broadway, was staged by the Atlantic Theater Company in May and June 2008. The play featured JoBeth Williams. Circle Mirror Transformation premiered Off-Broadway at Playwrights Horizons in October 2009 and received the Obie Award for Best New American Play and Performance.

The Aliens, which premiered Off-Broadway at Rattlestick Playwrights Theater in April 2010, was a finalist for the 2010 Susan Smith Blackburn Prize and shared the 2010 Obie Award for Best New American Play with Circle Mirror Transformation.

Her adaptation of Anton Chekhov's Uncle Vanya premiered at the Soho Repertory Theatre in June 2012, running through August 26,  and was called a "funky, fresh new production" by The New York Times reviewer. Directed by Sam Gold, the cast featured Reed Birney (as Vanya), Maria Dizzia, Georgia Engel, Peter Friedman, Michael Shannon (as Astrov), Rebecca Schull and Merritt Wever (as Sonya). Michael Shannon and Merritt Wever received the 2012 Joe A. Callaway Award for their performances.

The Flick premiered at Playwrights Horizons in March 2013, and received the Obie Award for Playwriting in 2013. The Flick won the 2014 Pulitzer Prize for Drama and the 2016 Critics’ Circle Theatre Award for Best New Play.

Baker's The Antipodes premiered Off-Broadway at the Signature Theatre Company with previews on April 4, 2017; it opened officially on April 23, directed by Lila Neugebauer. The cast featured Phillip James Brannon, Josh Charles, Josh Hamilton, Danny Mastrogiorgio, Danny McCarthy, Emily Cass McDonnell, Brian Miskell, Will Patton, and Nicole Rodenburg. The engagement was extended to June 4.

John
John opened Off-Broadway at the Signature Theatre on July 22, 2015 (previews). It was directed by Sam Gold and starred Georgia Engel and Lois Smith. The play ran to September 6. This marked the fifth time that Baker and Gold worked together, starting with Circle Mirror Transformation in 2009. The play is set in a bed and breakfast in Gettysburg, Pennsylvania. Time ranked it at No. 8 on its list of Top Ten Plays and Musicals for 2015. It is No. 8 in The Hollywood Reporter's "Best New York Theater of 2015". The New York Times wrote that the play is a "...haunting and haunted meditation on topics she has made so singularly her own: the omnipresence of loneliness in human life, and the troubled search for love and lasting connection."

John was nominated for the 2016 Lucille Lortel Awards, Outstanding Play; Outstanding Lead Actress in a Play (Georgia Engel); Outstanding Featured Actress in a Play (Lois Smith); Outstanding Scenic Design (Mimi Lien); and Outstanding Lighting Design (Mark Barton). John received six 2016 Drama Desk Award nominations: Outstanding Play; Outstanding Actress in a Play (Georgia Engel); Outstanding Director of a Play; Outstanding Set Design for a Play (Mimi Lien); Outstanding Lighting Design for a Play (Mike Barton); and Outstanding Sound Design in a Play (Bray Poor). John won the 2016 Obie Awards for Performance for Georgia Engel and a Special Citations: Collaboration, for Annie Baker, Sam Gold and the design team.

John opened in the West End at the National Theatre in January 2018. It was directed by James Macdonald, and starred Marylouise Burke (Mertis) and June Watson (Genevieve). Andy Propst of Time Out ranked it the 40th best play ever written, and it made a 2019 list by The Independent.

The Shirley, Vermont Plays Festival
In October and November 2010, three Boston theatre companies produced Baker's three plays that are set in the fictional town of Shirley, Vermont: Circle Mirror Transformation, produced by the Huntington Theatre Company, Body Awareness, produced by SpeakEasy Stage Company, and The Aliens, produced by Company One.

Teaching
Baker teaches playwriting at New York University, Barnard College, and in the MFA program at Stony Brook Southampton. She is also on the faculty of the Rita and Burton Goldberg MFA in Playwriting program of Hunter College.

Political activism

In July 2017, Baker was among 60 artists who signed an open letter organized by the group Adalah-NY that called on Lincoln Center to cancel performances of a play by Israeli author and peace activist David Grossman.

Style
Time Out New York wrote in 2008 that Baker "creates normal individuals coping with everyday issues in their small-town lives," and that her play Body Awareness "marks the arrival of a new playwright who would seem to fit the quirky bill, but aims for sincerity instead. Even though there's goofiness aplenty in her work, [she] sticks to straightforward narrative and simple dialogue. The writing isn't superficially clever, it's smart." The New Yorker said Baker "wants life onstage to be so vivid, natural, and emotionally precise that it bleeds into the audience’s visceral experience of time and space. Drawing on the immediacy of overheard conversation, she has pioneered a style of theatre made to seem as untheatrical as possible, while using the tools of the stage to focus audience attention...." The website The Daily Beast found that, "Baker’s skill is to make us work hard as an audience to make our own sense of her play[s] — the best, most enriching way to view any theatrical performance. Baker’s works are not for those who want easy, A-leads-to-B plots, and spoon-fed meanings... Baker, as all great playwrights do, is holding a mirror up to us all."

Honors
Baker was one of seven playwrights selected to participate in the 2008 Sundance Institute Theatre Lab.

In 2011 she was named a Fellow of United States Artists. In 2013 she received The Steinberg Playwright Award, which included a $50,000 prize.

She was a 2014 Guggenheim Fellow, Creative Arts Drama & Performance Art. A new play, titled The Last of the Little Hours, written by Baker was chosen for development at the Sundance Institute's 2014 Theatre Lab in Utah to be presented in July. Annie Baker directed the play herself. The play "follows the daily life of a group of Benedictine monks."

She was a New York Public Library 2015 Cullman Center Fellow and worked on a play about Benedictine monks. She is a MacDowell Colony Fellow taking residence in 2009 and 2014.

Baker is part of the Signature Theatre's "Residency Five" program, which "guarantees each playwright three world-premiere productions of new plays over the course of a five-year residency." John is Baker's first play under this program. The Antipodes is her second play under this program, and premiered on April 18, 2017.

She has been named a 2017 MacArthur Fellow (also known as a "Genius" Grant), which has a monetary amount of $625,000 over a five-year period. She was awarded for “mining the minutiae of how we speak, act, and relate to one another and the absurdity and tragedy that result from the limitations of language.”

Works

Body Awareness, world premiere at Atlantic Theater Company, June 2008
Circle Mirror Transformation, world premiere at Playwrights Horizons, October 2009
The Aliens, world premiere at Rattlestick Playwrights Theater (Off-Broadway), April 2010
Nocturama, reading, May 10, 2010 at Manhattan Theatre Club
 Uncle Vanya (adaptation), June 2012 at Soho Repertory Theatre
The Flick, world premiere at Playwrights Horizons, March 2013
John, world premiere at Signature Theatre Company, July 2015 
The Antipodes, world premiere at Signature Theatre Company, April 2017

References

External links
 
 
 
 

1981 births
21st-century American dramatists and playwrights
Screenwriters from Massachusetts
Tisch School of the Arts alumni
Writers from Amherst, Massachusetts
Writers from Cambridge, Massachusetts
Living people
American women dramatists and playwrights
Pulitzer Prize for Drama winners
Obie Award recipients
Stony Brook University faculty
Barnard College faculty
MacArthur Fellows
21st-century American women writers
Brooklyn College alumni